John Philip Sousa (November 6, 1854 – March 6, 1932) was an American composer and conductor of the late Romantic era known primarily for American military marches. He is known as "The March King" or the "American March King", to distinguish him from his British counterpart Kenneth J. Alford. Among his best-known marches are "The Stars and Stripes Forever" (National March of the United States of America), "Semper Fidelis" (official march of the United States Marine Corps), "The Liberty Bell", "The Thunderer", and "The Washington Post".

Sousa began his career playing violin and studying music theory and composition under John Esputa and George Felix Benkert. His father enlisted him in the United States Marine Band as an apprentice in 1868. He left the band in 1875, and over the next five years, he performed as a violinist and learned to conduct. In 1880 he rejoined the Marine Band, and he served there for 12 years as director, after which he was hired to conduct a band organized by David Blakely, P.S. Gilmore's former agent. Blakely wanted to compete with Gilmore. From 1880 until his death, he focused exclusively on conducting and writing music. Sousa aided in the development of the sousaphone, a large brass instrument similar to the helicon and tuba.

Upon the outbreak of World War I, Sousa was awarded a wartime commission of lieutenant commander to lead the Naval Reserve Band in Illinois. He then returned to conduct the Sousa Band until he died in 1932. In the 1920s, he was promoted to the permanent rank of lieutenant commander in the naval reserve.

Early life and education
John Philip Sousa was born in Washington, D.C., the third of ten children of João António de Sousa (John Anthony Sousa) (September 22, 1824 – April 27, 1892), who was born in Spain to Portuguese parents, and his wife Maria Elisabeth Trinkhaus (May 20, 1826 – August 25, 1908), who was German and from Bavaria. He began his music education under the tuition of John Esputa Sr., who taught him solfeggio. This was short-lived, however, because of the teacher's frequent bad temper. His real music education began in 1861 or 1862 as a pupil of John Esputa Jr., the son of his previous teacher under whom Sousa studied violin, piano, flute, several brass instruments, and singing. Esputa shared his father's bad temper, and the relationship between teacher and pupil was often strained, but Sousa progressed very rapidly and was also found to have perfect pitch. He wrote his first composition, "An Album Leaf", during this period, but Esputa dismissed it as "bread and cheese", and the composition was subsequently lost. 

His father was a trombonist in the Marine Band, and he enlisted Sousa in the United States Marine Corps as an apprentice at age 13 to keep him from joining a circus band. In the same year he began studying music under George Felix Benkert. Sousa was enlisted under a minority enlistment, meaning that he would not be discharged until his 21st birthday.

Career
Sousa completed his apprenticeship in 1875 and began performing on the violin. He then joined a theatrical pit orchestra where he learned to conduct. He returned to the Marine Band as its head in 1880 and remained as its conductor until 1892. He led "The President's Own" band under five presidents from Rutherford B. Hayes to Benjamin Harrison. His band played at the inaugural balls of James A. Garfield in 1881 and Benjamin Harrison in 1889. 

The marching brass bass or sousaphone is a modified helicon created in 1893 by Philadelphia instrument maker J. W. Pepper at Sousa's request, using several of his suggestions in its design. He wanted a tuba that could sound upward and over the band whether its player was seated or marching. C.G. Conn recreated the instrument in 1898, and this was the model that Sousa preferred to use.

Sousa organized The Sousa Band the year that he left the Marine Band, and it toured from 1892 to 1931 and performed at 15,623 concerts, both in America and around the world, including at the World Exposition in Paris and at the Royal Albert Hall in London. In Paris, the Sousa Band marched through the streets to the Arc de Triomphe, one of only eight parades that the band marched in during its 40 years.

Military service

In 1868, Sousa enlisted in the Marine Corps at age 13 as an apprentice musician (his rank listed as "boy"). He left the Marine Corps in 1875. His second period of service began in 1880 and continued until 1892. During this period, Sousa led the Marine Band through its development into the country's premier military band. 

The Columbia Phonograph Company produced 60 recordings of the Marine Band conducted by Sousa, which led to his national fame. In July 1892, Sousa requested a discharge from the Marine Corps to pursue a financially promising civilian career as a band leader. He conducted a farewell concert at the White House on July 30, 1892, and was discharged from the Marine Corps the next day.

Sousa was commissioned as a lieutenant in the Naval Reserve on May 31, 1917, shortly after the United States declared war on Germany and entered World War I. He was 62 years old, the mandatory retirement age for Navy officers. During the war, he led the Navy Band at the Great Lakes Naval Station near Chicago, and he donated all of his naval salary except a token $1 per month to the Sailors' and Marines' Relief Fund. He was discharged from active duty after the end of the war in November 1918 and returned to conducting his own band. In the early 1920s, he was promoted to lieutenant commander in the Naval Reserve but did not return to active duty. He frequently wore his Navy uniform during performances for the remainder of his life.

For his service during the war, Sousa received the World War I Victory Medal and was elected as a Veteran Companion of the Military Order of Foreign Wars. He was also a member of the New York Athletic Club and Post 754 of the American Legion.

Personal life
On December 30, 1879, Sousa married Jane van Middlesworth Bellis (1862–1944), and their children were John Philip, Jr. (April 1, 1881 – May 18, 1937), Jane Priscilla (August 7, 1882 – October 28, 1958), and Helen (January 21, 1887 – October 14, 1975). All were buried in the John Philip Sousa plot in the Congressional Cemetery. Jane was descended from Adam Bellis who served in the New Jersey troops during the American Revolutionary War.

On March 15, 1881, the "March King" was initiated to the Scottish Rite Freemasonry in the Hiram Lodge No. 10, Washington, DC and later became Master Mason for 51 years.

Late in his life, Sousa lived in Sands Point, New York. He died of heart failure at age 77 on March 6, 1932, in his room at the Abraham Lincoln Hotel in Reading, Pennsylvania. He had conducted a rehearsal of "The Stars and Stripes Forever" the previous day with the Ringgold Band as its guest conductor. He is buried in Washington, D.C.'s Congressional Cemetery. His house Wildbank has been designated as a National Historic Landmark, although it remains a private home and is not open to the public.

Sousa has surviving descendants today; one of his great-grandsons, John Philip Sousa IV, works as a political activist for the Republican Party.

Honors
Sousa was decorated with the palms of the Order of Public Instruction of Portugal and the Order of Academic Palms of France. He also received the Royal Victorian Medal from King Edward VII of the United Kingdom in December 1901 for conducting a private birthday concert for Queen Alexandra.

In 1922, he accepted the invitation of the national chapter to become an honorary member of Kappa Kappa Psi, the national honorary band fraternity. In 1932, he was initiated as an honorary member of Phi Mu Alpha Sinfonia, a national fraternity for men in music, by the fraternity's Alpha Xi chapter at the University of Illinois.

The World War II Liberty ship  was named in his honor. The Marine Band possesses the ship's bell, using it in performances of the "Liberty Bell March".

In 1952, 20th Century Fox honored Sousa in their Technicolor feature film Stars and Stripes Forever with Clifton Webb portraying him. It was loosely based on Sousa's memoirs Marching Along.

In 1987, an act of Congress named "The Stars and Stripes Forever" as the national march of the United States.

In 2012, a crater on the planet Mercury was named in his honor.

He was posthumously enshrined in the Hall of Fame for Great Americans in 1976.

Memberships
Sousa was a member of the Sons of the Revolution, Military Order of Foreign Wars, American Legion, Freemasons, and the Society of Artists and Composers. He was also a member of the Salmagundi, Players, Musicians, New York Athletic, Lambs, Army and Navy and the Gridiron clubs of Washington.

Music

Sousa wrote over 130 marches, 15 operettas, 5 overtures, 11 suites, 24 dances, 28 fantasies, and countless arrangements of nineteenth-century western European symphonic works.

Marches

Sousa wrote over 130 marches, published by Harry Coleman of Philadelphia, Carl Fischer Music, the John Church Company, and the Sam Fox Publishing Company, the last association beginning in 1917 and continuing until his death. Some of his more well-known marches include:
 "Review" (1873) (Sousa's first published march)
 "The Gladiator March" (1886)
 "Semper Fidelis" (1888) (Official March of the United States Marine Corps)
 "The Washington Post" (1889)
 "The Thunderer" (1889)
 "The Loyal Legion March" (1890)
 "High School Cadets" (1890)
 "The Liberty Bell" (1893) (later used as the credits theme for Monty Python's Flying Circus TV series)
 "Manhattan Beach March" (1893)
 "King Cotton" (1895)
 "Stars and Stripes Forever" (1896) (National March of the United States)
 "El Capitan" (1896)
 "Hands Across the Sea" (1899)
 "Hail to the Spirit of Liberty" March (1900)
 "Invincible Eagle" (1901) (dedicated to Pan-American Buffalo Exposition) (Interim United States Space Force Anthem)
 "Imperial Edward" March (1902) Dedicated to King Edward VII of the United Kingdom
 "Fairest of the Fair" (1908)
 "Glory of the Yankee Navy" (1909)
 "Columbia's Pride" (1914)
 "U.S. Field Artillery" (1917) (modified version "The Army Goes Rolling Along" is the official song of the U.S. Army)
"Anchor & Star" (1918) Dedicated "To the U.S. Navy"
 "Who's Who in Navy Blue" (1920) (composed at the request of the United States Naval Academy class of 1920 and dedicated to Tamanend, a bronze reproduction of the figurehead of the U.S.S. Delaware that occupies a key place at the Academy)
 "The Gallant Seventh" (1922)
 "The Dauntless Battalion" (1922) Dedicated “To Col. Hyatt, the Faculty and Cadets of the Pennsylvania Military College” (Now Widener University in Chester, PA)
 "Nobles of the Mystic Shrine" (1923)
 "The Black Horse Troop" (1924) (written in honor of Troop A, 107th Cavalry, Ohio National Guard).
 "Pride of the Wolverines" (1926)
 "Minnesota March" (1927)
 "New Mexico March" (1928)
 "Salvation Army March" (1930) (dedicated to the Salvation Army's 50th anniversary in the U.S.)

Sousa wrote marches for several American universities, including the University of Minnesota, University of Illinois, University of Nebraska, Kansas State University, Marquette University, Pennsylvania Military College (Widener University), and the University of Michigan.

Operettas

Sousa wrote many notable operettas, including:
 Désirée (1883), libretto by Edward M. Taber
 El Capitan (1896), libretto by Charles Klein
 The Charlatan (1898), also known as The Mystical Miss, book by Charles Klein and lyrics by Sousa
 Chris and the Wonderful Lamp (1899), libretto by Glen MacDonough

Marches and waltzes have been derived from many of these stage-works. Sousa also composed the music for six operettas that were either unfinished or not produced:  The Devils' Deputy, Florine, The Irish Dragoon, Katherine, The Victory, and The Wolf.

In addition, Sousa wrote a march based on themes from Gilbert and Sullivan's comic opera The Mikado, the elegant overture Our Flirtations, several musical suites, etc. He frequently added Sullivan opera overtures or other Sullivan pieces to his concerts.

He was quoted saying, "My religion lies in my composition".

Hobbies, writing, and recording
Sousa ranked as one of the all-time great trapshooters and was enshrined in the Trapshooting Hall of Fame. He organized the first national trapshooting organization, a forerunner to today's Amateur Trapshooting Association (ATA). He also wrote numerous articles about trapshooting. He was a regular competitor representing the Navy in trapshooting competitions, particularly against the Army. Records indicate that he registered more than 35,000 targets during his shooting career. "Let me say that just about the sweetest music to me is when I call, 'pull,' the old gun barks, and the referee in perfect key announces, 'dead'."

In his 1902 novella The Fifth String, a virtuoso violinist makes a deal with the Devil for a magic violin with five strings. The first four strings excite the emotions of Pity, Hope, Love, and Joy, but the fifth string, made from the hair of Eve, will cause the player's death once played. The violinist wins the love of the woman he desires, but out of jealous suspicion, she commands him to play the death string, which he does. He published Pipetown Sandy in 1905, which includes a satirical poem titled "The Feast of the Monkeys". He wrote a 40,000-word story entitled "The Transit of Venus" in 1920. He also wrote the booklet "A manual for trumpet and drum", published by the Ludwig Drum Company with advice for playing drums and trumpet. An early version of the trumpet solo to "Semper Fidelis" was included in this volume.

Sousa held a very low opinion of the emerging recording industry. He derided recordings as "canned music", a reference to the early wax cylinder records that came in can-like cylindrical cardboard boxes. He argued to a congressional hearing in 1906:

Sousa's antipathy to recording was such that he did not conduct his band when it was being recorded. Nevertheless, the band made numerous recordings, the earliest being issued on cylinders by several companies, followed by many recordings on discs by the Berliner Gramophone Company and its successor, the Victor Talking Machine Company (later RCA Victor). The Berliner recordings were conducted by Henry Higgins (one of Sousa's cornet soloists) and Arthur Pryor (Sousa's trombone soloist and assistant conductor). Sousa claimed that he had "never been in the gramophone company's office in my life". Sousa did conduct a few of the Victor recordings, but most were conducted by Pryor, Herbert L. Clarke, Edwin H. Clarke, Walter B. Rogers (who had also been a cornet soloist with Sousa), Rosario Bourdon, Josef Pasternack, or Nathaniel Shilkret. Details of the Victor recordings are available in the external link below to the EDVR.

Sousa also appeared with his band in newsreels and on radio broadcasts, beginning with a 1929 nationwide broadcast on NBC. In 1999, "Legacy" Records released some of his historic recordings on CD.

John Philip Sousa Award

Even after his death, Sousa continues to be remembered as "The March King" through the John Philip Sousa Foundation. The non-profit organization, founded in 1981, recognizes one superior student in marching band for "musicianship, dependability, loyalty, and cooperation." The John Philip Sousa Foundation provides awards, scholarships, and projects such as The Sudler Trophy, The Sudler Shield, The Sudler Silver Scroll, The Sudler Flag of Honor, The Historic Roll of Honor, The Sudler Cup, The Hawkins Scholarship, National Young Artists, The National Community Band, and The Junior Honor Band Project. He won many honorable awards across his lifetime.

See also
 Sousa Archives and Center for American Music
 Academy of Music/Riviera Theatre
 William Bell (tuba player)
 John Philip Sousa Bridge
 Patrick Gilmore

References

Citations

Sources

 75 years after death here, Sousa sells out the Abe – Reading Eagle Newspaper
 Congressional hearing: in Copyright's Communication Policy by Professor Tim Woo, University of Virginia, May 2004 – Caution, 560k PDF.

Further reading
Berger, Kenneth W. The March King and His Band : The Story of John Philip Sousa. New York: Exposition Press, 1957.
Bierley, Paul E. John Philip Sousa: A Descriptive Catalog of His Works. Urbana: University of Illinois Press, 1973.
Bierley, Paul E. John Philip Sousa: American Phenomenon. Miami, FL: Warner Bros. Publications, 2001.
Bierley, Paul E. The Incredible Band of John Philip Sousa Urbana: University of Illinois Press, 2006.
Delaplaine, Edward S. John Philip Sousa and the National Anthem. Frederick, MD: Great Southern Press, 1983.
Heslip, Malcolm. Nostalgic Happenings in the Three Bands of John Philip Sousa. Westerville, OH: Integrity Press, 1992.
Lingg, Ann M. John Philip Sousa. New York: Holt, 1954.
Newsom, Jon, ed. Perspectives on John Philip Sousa. Washington: Library of Congress, 1983.
Proksch, Bryan, ed. A Sousa Reader: Essays, Interviews, and Clippings. Chicago: GIA, 2017
 Warfield, Patrick. Making the March King: John Philip Sousa's Washington Years, 1854–1893 (University of Illinois Press; 2013) 331 pages; scholarly biography

Music sources
Bierley, Paul E. The Works of John Philip Sousa Columbus, OH: Integrity Press, 1984.
Sousa, John Philip. Marching Along: Recollections of Men, Women and Music. Edited by Paul E. Bierley. Boston: Hale, Cushman & Flint, 1928, rev. 1994.
Sousa, John Philip. National, Patriotic and Typical Airs of All Lands. N.Y.: Da Capo Press, 1977.
Sousa, John Philip. Through the Year with Sousa: Excerpts from the Operas, Marches, Miscellaneous Compositions, Novels, Letters, Magazine Articles, Songs, Sayings and Rhymes of John Philip Sousa. New York: Thomas Y. Crowell &, 1910.
 Warfield, Patrick, ed. (2010). John Philip Sousa: Six Marches. Music of the United States of America (MUSA) vol 21. Madison, Wisconsin: A-R Editions.

Articles
Bennett, Jeb. "John Philip Sousa: 100th Anniversary." Marine Corps Gazette 64, no. 10 (1980): 31–34.
Bierley, Paul E. "Sousa: America's Greatest Composer?" Musical Journal 25, no. 1 (1967): 83–87.
Bierley, Paul E. "Sousa on Programming." Instrumentalist, December 1973.
Bierley, Paul E. "Sousa's Mystery March." Instrumentalist, February 1966.
Dvorak, Raymond F. "Recollections of Sousa's March Performances." School Musician, Director and Teacher, December 1969.
Evenson, Orville. "The March Style of Sousa." Instrumentalist, November 1954.
Fennell, Frederick. "Sousa: Still a Somebody." Instrumentalist, March 1982.
Gaydos, Jeff. "Stars and Stripes and Sousa Forever!" Bandwagon, June 1980.
Goldberg, Isaac. "Sousa." American Mercury 27 (1932): 193–200.
Goldman, Richard Franko. "John Philip Sousa." HiFi/Stereo Review 19, no. 1 (1967): 35–47.
Gordon, Marjorie M. "John Philip Sousa: A Centennial-Year Salute to the March King." Musical Journal 11, no. 11 (1954): 28–34.
Heney, John J. "On the Road with the Sousa Band." School Musician, Director and Teacher, 1976.
Howard, George S. "A New Era for Brass: Sousa's Role." Music Journal, January 1966.
Intravaia, Lawrence J. "Wind Band Scoring Practices of Gilmore and Sousa." School Musician, Director and Teacher 36, no. 7 (March 1965): 62–63.
Larson, Cedric. "John Philip Sousa as an Author." Etude, August 1941.
Mangrum, Mary Gailey. "I Remember Sousa." Instrumentalist 24, no. 5 (1969): 38–41.
Mangrum, Mary Gailey. "Sousa the Patriot." Instrumentalist 24, no. 6 (1970): 33–35.
Marek, George Richard. "John Philip Sousa." HiFi/Musical America 23, no. 11 (1973): 57–61.
Mathews, William Smith Babcock. "An Interview with John Philip Sousa." Music: A Monthly Magazine 9 (1896): 487–92.
Mayer, Francis N. "John Philip Sousa: His Instrumentation and Scoring." Music Educator's Journal, January 1960.
Peterson, O. A. "The Human Side of Sousa." Musical Messenger, May 1916.
Pleasants, Henry. "A Look at Sousa: Ormandy and Critics." International Herald Tribune (Paris Edition), December 1969.
"Sousa and His Mission." Music: A Monthly Magazine 16 (July 1899): 272–76.
"Sousa as He Is." Music: A Monthly Magazine 14 (May 1899).
"Sousa's New Marine Band." Musical Courier, November 9, 1892.
Stoddard, Hope. "Sousa: Symbol of an Era." International Musician, December 1948.
Thomson, Grace F. "Memories of the March King." Musical Journal 22, no. 5 (1964): 27–49.
Trimborn, Thomas J. "In the Footsteps of Sousa." Instrumentalist 35, no. 4 (1980): 10–13.
Wimbush, Roger. "Sousa at the "Proms"" Monthly Musical Record 68:238–40.

Dissertations
Bly, Leon Joseph. "The March in American Society." Diss., University of Miami, 1977.
Bowie, Gordon W. "R. B. Hall and the Community Bands of Maine." Diss., University of Maine, 1993.
Carpenter, Kenneth William. "A History of the United States Marine Band." Diss., University of Iowa, 1971.
Church, Charles Fremont. "The Life and Influence of John Philip Sousa." Diss., Ohio State University, 1942.
Darling, Matthew H. "A Study and Catalogue of the Solos Composed, Arranged, and Transcribed for Xylophone and Band by John Joseph Heney (1902–1978), Percussionist (1926–31) and Xylophone Soloist (1931) with the John Philip Sousa Band." Diss., University of Arizona, 1998.
Hemberger, Glen J. "Selected Songs for Chamber Winds and Soprano: Rediscovering a Forgotten Repertoire of John Philip Sousa." Diss., University of North Texas, 2001.
Hester, Michael E. "A Study of the Saxophone Soloists Performing with the John Philip Sousa Band, 1893–1930." Diss., University of Arizona, 1995.
Jorgensen, Michael R. "John Philip Sousa's Operetta El Capitan: A Historical, Analytical, and Performance Guide." Diss., Ball State University, 1995.
Korzun, Jonathan Nicholas. "The Orchestral Transcriptions for Band of John Philip Sousa: a Description and Analysis." Diss., University of Illinois at Urbana-Champaign, 1994.
Kreitner, Mona Bulpitt. "'A Splendid Group of American Girls': The Women Who Sang with the Sousa Band." Diss., University of Memphis, 2007.
Norton, Pauline Elizabeth Hosack. "March Music in Nineteenth Century America." Diss., University of Michigan, 1983.
Stacy, William Barney. "John Philip Sousa and His Band Suites." Diss., University of Colorado, 1973.
Summers, C. Oland. "The Development of Original Band Scoring from Sousa to Husa." Diss., Ball State University, 1986.
Warfield, Patrick. ""Salesman of Americanism, Globetrotter and Musician" the Nineteenth-century John Philip Sousa; 1854–1893." Diss., Indiana University, 2003.
Whisler, John A. "The Songs of John Philip Sousa." Diss., Memphis State University, 1975.
Wright, Maurice. "The Fifth String: an Opera in One Act." Diss., Columbia University, 1989.

Archives
John Philip Sousa papers, 1695–1966  at the United States Marine Band Library and Archives  in Washington, D.C.
John Philip Sousa Collection, 1854–2005, The March King: John Philip Sousa digital collection, the Music of John Philip Sousa and Victor Grabel,  and the Dodrill – Sousa sheet music collection at the Library of Congress
The Sousa Archives and Center for American Music. University of Illinois at Urbana-Champaign, 2011.

External links

 
 
 
 
 John Philip Sousa recordings at the Discography of American Historical Recordings.

 
1854 births
1932 deaths
19th-century American composers
19th-century classical composers
19th-century conductors (music)
20th-century American composers
20th-century American conductors (music)
20th-century American male musicians
20th-century classical composers
American classical composers
American classical tubists
American male classical composers
American male conductors (music)
American musical theatre composers
American operetta composers
American people of German descent
American people of Portuguese descent
American people of Spanish descent
American Romantic composers
Burials at the Congressional Cemetery
Classical musicians from Washington, D.C.
Concert band composers
Hall of Fame for Great Americans inductees
Male musical theatre composers
Male operetta composers
March musicians
Members of The Lambs Club
Military music composers
Military personnel from Washington, D.C.
People from Sands Point, New York
Ragtime composers
Trap and double trap shooters
United States Marine Band musicians
United States Marine Corps officers
United States military musicians
United States Navy Band musicians
United States Navy officers
United States Navy personnel of World War I
United States Navy reservists
Vaudeville performers